Leptosiaphos kilimensis, commonly known as the Kilimanjaro five-toed skink, is a species of lizard in the family Scincidae. It is found in Kenya, Tanzania, and South Sudan.

References

Leptosiaphos
Reptiles described in 1891
Taxa named by Leonhard Stejneger